Ad. Dili Oeste or Associação Desportiva Dili Oeste is a football club of East Timor. The team plays in the Taça Digicel.

External links
 Ad. Dili Oeste at National-Football-Teams.com

Football clubs in East Timor
Football
Sport in Dili
Association football clubs established in 2010
2010 establishments in East Timor
Dili Oeste